Óscar García Guzmán (born 1990), known as The Monster of Toluca, is a Mexican serial killer. He was first identified as a suspect in the disappearance of a fellow Technological University of Mexico (UNITEC) student on October 30th, 2019, when, after searching his home in Villa Santin, Toluca, State of Mexico, police officers found the strangled bodies of three women, two of which were buried in his backyard and the other was hidden in his bathroom. Guzmán fled from the police and boasted that he would continue to kill women unless his pets' safety was guaranteed, though he was arrested in Mexico City on December 6th, 2019, by the Attorney General's Office. After his capture, he admitted to the killing of not only the three women found in his home, but also to the murders of a girl and her father in Otzolotepec in 2012 and to the murder of his own father in 2006, when he was just 16 years old; the prosecution has confirmed these three further confessions. Guzmán is currently held in prison and has begun trial proceedings.

Background 
Little is known about Guzmán's early life before his crimes, although there have been claims that his father was abusive to Guzmán and his mother. 

Though Guzmán has declared that he was attracted to the idea of killing in his youth, unlike many other serial killers, he has also shown a great interest and attachment to animals. At the time of his capture, Guzmán kept two dogs and a cat as pets, and expressed great concern for their well-being during his time in jail. According to Dr. Feggy Ostrosky, his inclination towards animals could be a result of pathological narcissism, in which Guzmán sees himself as a "protector"; by taking care of animals he can fulfill his desire for power without any resistance from his subordinates. Dr. Ostrosky considers Guzmán to be a psychopath and a narcissist, who is eager for attention.

Prior to his capture, Guzmán's hobbies were krav maga, which he actively practised for at least four years, death metal, and satanism; Guzmán also enjoyed stories about serial killers, saying he admired them for their "intelligence". Although he had lived alone for years, Guzmán was financially dependent on his mother, and neighbors described him as a quiet man who never spoke to anyone and always dressed in black. At the time of his capture, he was studying psychology at UNITEC.

Murders

Initial killings 
Guzmán's first victim was his own father, whom he murdered at 16 years of age in 2006. He confessed to the crime during a phone call to his mother from prison in January 2020. Eventually, he formally admitted his guilt of the crime to the prosecution. While the circumstances surrounding his father's death have not been disclosed to the public, the prosecution has confirmed that Guzmán was indeed responsible.

His second and third victims were a man identified only as "Tomás" and the man's daughter, identified only as "Mónica", respectively. Guzmán first encountered Mónica on September 10, 2012, at a high school in Otzolotepec, where he quickly became infatuated with the girl and began stalking her. He went to her house and decided to rifle through her belongings, unaware that the girl's father, Tomás, was there. After being discovered by the latter, Guzmán decided to kill him, stabbing the man repeatedly and finishing him off with an axe. He then waited for Mónica to return, with Tomás' remains still in the house. When she arrived, Guzmán subdued her using krav maga and took her to his house in Villa Santin, where he kept the girl alive for two weeks, repeatedly sexually assaulting and torturing her, before ending her life by beating her to death two days before her birthday. He then dismembered her body, put the remains in cardboard boxes, and threw them in a ravine in El Mirador, Mexico City.

Fourth and fifth murders 
Guzmán's fourth victim was Adriana González Hernández, a 27-year-old psychology student at the Insurgentes University of Toluca, who disappeared on March 24, 2017 after leaving her home in the El Ranchito neighborhood in Toluca. According to relatives, a few days before Hernández's disappearance, she presented Guzmán as her "boyfriend" at a family gathering. Guzmán later confessed to activist Frida Guerrera Villalvazo that he kept Hernández alive until February 2018.

His fifth victim was Martha Patricia "Patty" Nava Sotelo, a 25-year-old criminology and law student who disappeared on February 9, 2019 in Huixquilucan. Months before she vanished, Nava expressed concerns to her family that somebody was following her, in particular, the driver of a black truck. It is believed that Guzmán was familiar with the Nava family, as his victim's mother was his neighbor. After her disappearance, Nava's final cell phone reception was determined to be near Guzmán's Villa Santin house. She was held captive under the effects of Rivotril (a brand of clonazepam) for several days until her death sometime later that same month.

Final murder 
The last victim was Jéssica Guadalupe Orihuela, a 23-year-old psychology student studying at UNITEC with Guzmán, who disappeared on October 24, 2019, after leaving her home in Colonia. Guzmán had reportedly begun harassing her months before her abduction. When Orihuela vanished, her family believed that Guzmán was responsible; they went to his house on several occasions to speak with him, but Guzmán repeatedly denied having seen Orihuela and ended up threatening them if they didn't "stop bothering him." Family members remained outside the house beginning on October 26th, claiming that they saw Orihuela through the windows. However, the police were unable to act on the family's claims without a court order, which took until October 30th to arrive. The police entered the house on that date, but by then, Guzmán had fled. While examining the house, they found Jéssica's strangled body in the bathroom. She had reportedly been killed just hours prior to discovery.

Eventual arrest 
After evading capture following the police search of his home on October 30th, 2019, Guzmán taunted authorities over social media for their failure to arrest him. He also threatened to continue killing more women if the authorities were not able to return his pets and/or guarantee their safety. Guzmán was captured on December 6th, 2019, in the Cascos de Santo Tomás neighborhood in Mexico City, after he was located by agents of the Attorney General's Office after he connected to public wifi during a music festival.

See also
List of serial killers by country

References 

1990 births
20th-century Mexican criminals
Living people
Male serial killers
Mexican murderers of children
Mexican rapists
Mexican serial killers
Patricides
People from the State of Mexico